Jaime Cubero (April 5, 1926 in Jundiaí – May 20, 1998 in São Paulo) was a Brazilian intellectual, journalist, educator and activist linked to the anarchist movement. While still in his teens he founded, with the help of friends, the Youth Center for Social Studies. He participated in numerous activities (lectures, courses, debates, theater plays) in cultural centers in Rio de Janeiro and São Paulo. As an active anarchist militant, he maintained a line critical to the Estado Novo of Getúlio Vargas and the military dictatorship in Brazil, as well as the authoritarianism of Brazilian political parties and Marxists.

He worked for the newspaper O Globo, between 1954 and 1964, when he was forced to leave by the military dictatorship. He actively participated in academic and student circles, advising on the history of Brazilian social movements and libertarian pedagogy. He participated in anarchist congresses in Brazil and abroad. In recent years, he worked as editor of the magazine Libertárias. He died at the age of 71, a victim of health problems.

References

Further reading

1924 births
1998 deaths
Brazilian anarchists
Brazilian educators
Brazilian journalists
20th-century Brazilian people